Parawera Cone is a cone rising to c.1300 m at the northeast end of Tekapo Ridge in Kyle Hills, Ross Island. The cone is 1 nautical mile (1.9 km) northwest of Ainley Peak. The name Parawera (meaning south wind) is one of several Maorai wind names applied by New Zealand Geographic Board (NZGB) in this area.

Mountains of Ross Island